Vinicius Réquia Machado (born 29 February 2000) is a Brazilian footballer who plays as a goalkeeper for Portuguese club Nacional.

Club career
Born in Montenegro, Rio Grande do Sul, Vinicius Machado joined Grêmio's youth setup in 2012, aged 12. On 25 October 2016, he signed his first professional deal with the club.

Vinicius Machado made his senior debut on 13 October 2018, starting in a 0–0 away draw against Avenida, for the year's Copa FGF. On 5 June 2020, he renewed his link until the end of 2021.

On 26 February 2021, Vinicius Machado moved to Ceará on a two-year contract. He made his Série A debut on 30 May 2021, coming on as a half-time substitute for injured João Ricardo in a 3–2 home success over Grêmio.

On 30 January 2023, Machado signed a two-and-a-half-year contract with Nacional.

Career statistics

References

External links
Ceará profile 

2000 births
Sportspeople from Rio Grande do Sul
Living people
Brazilian footballers
Association football goalkeepers
Grêmio Foot-Ball Porto Alegrense players
Ceará Sporting Club players
Anápolis Futebol Clube players
C.D. Nacional players
Campeonato Brasileiro Série A players
Liga Portugal 2 players
Brazilian expatriate footballers
Expatriate footballers in Portugal
Brazilian expatriate sportspeople in Portugal